The BMW 114 was a nine-cylinder air-cooled radial engine intended for military aircraft use. Developed in 1935 from the BMW 132, with which it could be interchanged, work did not progress beyond experimental prototype engines.

Specifications (BMW 114)

See also

References

Notes

Bibliography

 Gunston, Bill. World Encyclopedia of Aero Engines. Cambridge, England. Patrick Stephens Limited, 1989. 
 Fred Jakobs, Robert Kröschel and Christian Pierer. "BMW Aero Engines". BMW Group Classic, 2009

External links

BMW 114 at BMW Group archives

1930s aircraft piston engines
Aircraft air-cooled radial piston engines
Aircraft radial diesel engines
114